Hans Putz (November 17, 1920 in Vienna – January 31, 1990 in Hamburg) was an Austrian actor.  He had a stage career, including working at the Schauspielhaus Zürich and the Volkstheater in Vienna; he also appeared in a number of films.

Partial filmography

 Gottes Engel sind überall (1948) - Franz Wudra
 Arlberg Express (1948) - Flori Reutner
 Lambert fühlt sich bedroht (1949) - (uncredited)
 Rosen der Liebe (1949) - Praterbesucher Ferdl
 Der Schuß durchs Fenster (1950) - Chauffeur Strinzel
 The Fourth Commandment (1950) - Martin Schalanter - beider Sohn
 Großstadtnacht (1950)
 Four in a Jeep (1951) - Karl Idinger
 Gangsterpremiere (1951) - Willi
 Wienerinnen (1952) - Paul Rosenauer
 Verlorene Melodie (1952) - Toni
 Lavender (1953) - Kramer
 Anna Louise and Anton (1953) - Robert
 König der Manege (1954) - Jack Holl, Aktrobat, Tänzer
 Bruder Martin (1954) - Steighofer
 Hoheit lassen bitten (1954) - Lembke
 The Eternal Waltz (1954) - Alexander Girardi
 The Doctor's Secret (1955) - Charly
 His Daughter is Called Peter (1955)
 The Dairymaid of St. Kathrein (1955) - Franz
 Ein Herz schlägt für Erika (1956)
 Teenage Wolfpack (1956)
 Ein Mann muß nicht immer schön sein (1956) - Taschenkrebs
 For Love and Others (1959) - Dr. Morsky
 Im Namen einer Mutter (1960) - Wendland
 Hin und her (1963)
 In der Sache J. Robert Oppenheimer (1964) - Borris T. Pasch
 I Am Looking for a Man (1966) - Bauunternehmer Märtens
 The Murderer with the Silk Scarf (1966) - Toni Stein (voice, uncredited)
 The Smooth Career (1967) - Wolf Kamper
 Sir Roger Casement (1968, TV Series) - Arthur Conan Doyle
  (1968, TV Movie) - Oberkommissar Leo Klipp
 St. Pauli Report (1971) - Paul Besser
 Der letzte Werkelmann (1972) - Leo Wessely
 Die Konsequenz (1976, TV Movie) - Dusterer
 Moselbrück (1987–1993, TV Series) - Ludwig Zerfass (final appearance)

References

1920 births
1990 deaths
Austrian male stage actors
Male actors from Vienna
Austrian male film actors
20th-century Austrian male actors